Van Bommel is a Dutch toponymic surname meaning "from/of Bommel", the historical name of the city of Zaltbommel. People with the surname include:

 Cornelius Richard Anton van Bommel (1790–1852), Dutch  bishop of Liège
 (1819–1890), Dutch city- and landscape painter
 Harry van Bommel (born 1962), Dutch Socialist Party politician
 Maria Van Bommel, Canadian (Ontario) politician
 Mark van Bommel (born 1977), Dutch former football midfielder
 Nelly van Bommel, French choreographer

See also
Museum van Bommel van Dam

References

Dutch-language surnames
Surnames of Dutch origin
Toponymic surnames